Sir Vivyan (or Vyvian) Edward Naylor-Leyland, 3rd Baronet (1924-1987) was a British aristocrat and banker.

Biography

Early life
Vivian Edward Naylor-Leyland was born on 5 March 1924. His father was Sir Albert Naylor-Leyland, 2nd Baronet (1890-1952) and his mother, Marguerite de Belabre. His paternal grandfather was Sir Herbert Scarisbrick Naylor-Leyland, 1st Baronet (1864–1899), who served as Member of Parliament for Colchester from 1892 to 1895 and for Southport from 1898 to 1899. He grew up at his paternal family residence of Nantclwyd Hall, a Grade II listed mansion in Llanelidan, Denbighshire, Wales.

He was educated at Eton College, a private boarding school in Eton, Berkshire. He graduated from Christ Church, Oxford, a constituent college of the University of Oxford, and the Royal Agricultural University in Cirencester, Gloucestershire.

Career
He served in the Grenadier Guards of the British Army, becoming Lieutenant.

Later, he made a fortune as a banker in Liverpool.

On 23 September 1952 he became the 3rd Baronet Naylor-Leyland, of Hyde Park House, Albert Gate, London. With his inherited title came the family country seat of Nantclwyd Hall. At Nantclwyd, he commissioned the architect Clough Williams-Ellis (1883–1978) to add a fibreglass temple, a clock tower, a ceremonial arch, gazebos, a dovecote, and formal gardens.

Personal life
On 17 January 1952 he married Hon. Elizabeth-Anne Marie Gabrielle Fitzalan-Howard, the daughter of Henry FitzAlan-Howard, 2nd Viscount FitzAlan of Derwent (1882-1962) and Joyce Elizabeth Mary Langdale (1898–1995). They had a son, Sir Philip Vyvian Naylor-Leyland, 4th Baronet. On 17 November 1967 he married Noreen Starr Anker Simmons; they had a daughter. Thirdly, he married Jameina Flora Reid. They had two daughters. He died on 2 September 1987 at the age of 63.

References

1924 births
1987 deaths
People from Denbighshire
People educated at Eton College
Alumni of Christ Church, Oxford
Alumni of the Royal Agricultural University
Grenadier Guards officers
English bankers
Baronets in the Baronetage of the United Kingdom
Llanelidan
Vivian
20th-century English businesspeople